This list includes all 318 stations in Thuringia, that are currently served by public transport.

Description

The list is organised as follows:

 Number: this lists the last four digits of the International Station Number (Internationale Bahnhofsnummer, IBNR).
 Name: the current name of the station or halt. 
 Category: The category shows the status at 1 January 2012 and only applies to stations operated by DB Station&Service AG.
 The next four columns show which types of train stop at the station. The abbreviations are those used by the DB AG but apply to similar train types of other operators:
 ICE = Intercity-Express
 IC = Intercity and Eurocity
 RE = Regionalexpress
 RB = Regionalbahn, Erfurter Bahn, Süd-Thüringen-Bahn, cantus and Harzer Schmalspurbahnen
 Line: this column gives the railway line on which the station is situated.

* Only nostalgic excursions on some weekends

Stations not operated by DB

Railway hubs 
All stations where at least two routes meet or met (junctions of main lines are in bold): 
Altenburg (Leipzig–Hof and Altenburg–Zeitz (closed), Altenburg–Langenleuba-Oberhain (closed))
Arnstadt (Erfurt–Schweinfurt, Arnstadt–Saalfeld and Arnstadt–Ichtershausen (closed))
Artern (Sangerhausen–Erfurt and Artern–Berga-Kelbra (closed))
Bad Berka (Weimar–Kranichfeld and Bad Berka–Blankenhain (closed))
Bad Blankenburg (Arnstadt–Saalfeld and Schwarza–Bad Blankenburg (closed))
Bad Langensalza (Gotha–Leinefelde, Erfurt–Bad Langensalza and Bad Langensalza–Haussömmern (closed))
Bad Salzungen (Eisenach–Meiningen and Bad Salzungen–Vacha (currently out of service))
Ballstädt (Gotha–Leinefelde and Ballstädt–Straußfurt (closed))
Bleicherode (Halle–Kassel and Bleicherode–Herzberg (closed))
Bretleben (Erfurt–Sangerhausen and Sondershausen–Bretleben (closed))
Bufleben (Gotha–Leinefelde and Bufleben–Großenbehringen (closed))
Buttstädt (Straussfurt–Grossheringen and Buttstädt–Rastenberg (closed))
Camburg (Naumburg–Saalfeld and Zeitz–Camburg (closed))
Crossen an der Elster (Leipzig–Gera and Crossen–Porstendorf (closed))
Döllstädt (Erfurt–Bad Langensalza and Ballstädt–Straußfurt (closed))
Dorndorf (Bad Salzungen–Vacha (still out of service) and Dorndorf–Kaltennordheim (closed))
Ebeleben (Mühlhausen–Sondershausen (only goods traffic from Sondershausen) and Greussen–Keula (closed))
Eisenach (Erfurt–Eisenach–Bebra and Eisenach–Meiningen)
Eisfeld (Meiningen–Eisfeld–Coburg (Eisfeld–Coburg closed), Eisfeld–Sonneberg and Eisfeld–Schönbrunn (closed))
Eisfelder Talmühle (Nordhausen−Wernigerode and Eisfelder Talmühle–Stiege)
Erfurt (Halle–Erfurt–Eisenach, Erfurt–Nordhausen, Sangerhausen–Erfurt and Erfurt–Nottleben (closed))
Ernstthal am Rennsteig (Sonneberg–Probstzella (closed towards Probstzella) and branch to Neuhaus am Rennweg)
Esperstedt (Sondershausen–Bretleben and Esperstedt–Oldisleben (closed))
Fröttstädt (Erfurt–Eisenach and Fröttstädt–Friedrichroda–Georgenthal)
Georgenthal (Gotha–Gräfenroda, Fröttstädt–Friedrichroda–Georgenthal (closed) and Georgenthal–Tambach-Dietharz (closed))
Gera (Leipzig–Gera–Saalfeld, Weimar–Gera, Gera–Plauen, Gera–Gößnitz and Gera–Wuitz-Mumsdorf (closed))
Gerstungen (Eisenach–Bebra and Gerstungen–Vacha (only goods traffic))
Göschwitz (Naumburg–Saalfeld and Weimar–Gera)
Gößnitz (Leipzig–Hof, Gera–Gößnitz and Glauchau–Gößnitz railway)
Gotha (Erfurt–Eisenach, Gotha–Leinefelde, Gotha–Tabarz and Gotha–Gräfenroda)
Gräfenroda (Erfurt–Schweinfurt and Gotha–Gräfenroda)
Gräfentonna (Erfurt–Bad Langensalza and Ballstädt–Straußfurt (closed))
Greiz (Gera–Plauen and Neumark–Greiz (closed))
Greussen (Erfurt–Nordhausen and Greussen–Keula (closed))
Grimmenthal (Meiningen–Eisfeld and Erfurt–Schweinfurt)
Grossheringen (Halle–Erfurt, Grossheringen–Saalfeld and Straussfurt–Grossheringen)
Grossrudestedt (Erfurt–Sangerhausen and Weimar–Grossrudestedt (closed))
Heiligenstadt (Halle–Kassel and Heiligenstadt–Eschwege (closed))
Hildburghausen (Meiningen–Eisfeld and Hildburghausen–Lindenau-Friedrichshall (closed))
Hockeroda (Saalfeld–Bamberg and Hockeroda–Bad Lobenstein)
Hohenebra (Erfurt–Nordhausen and Hohenebra–Mühlhausen (only goods traffic))
Ilmenau (Plaue–Ilmenau–Themar and Ilmenau–Großbreitenbach (closed))
Immelborn (Eisenach–Meiningen and Immelborn–Steinbach (closed))
Köditzberg (Rottenbach–Katzhütte and branch to Königsee (closed)) 
Kölleda (Straußfurt–Großheringen and Kölleda–Laucha (closed))
Kühnhausen (Erfurt–Nordhausen and (Erfurt)–Kühnhausen–Bad Langensalza)
Leinefelde (Halle–Kassel, Gotha–Leinefelde, Leinefelde–Eschwege (closed) and Leinefelde–Wulften (closed))
Meiningen (Eisenach–Lichtenfels, Meiningen–Schweinfurt and Meiningen–Erfurt)
Meuselwitz (Altenburg–Zeitz (closed), Meuselwitz–Ronneburg (closed) and Meuselwitz–Lucka (closed))
Mühlhausen (Gotha–Leinefelde, Mühlhausen–Treffurt–Eschwege (closed) and Mühlhausen–Ebeleben (closed))
Neudietendorf (Erfurt–Eisenach and (Erfurt)–Neudietendorf–Schweinfurt)
Niederpöllnitz (Leipzig–Gera–Saalfeld and Niederpöllnitz-Münchenbernsdorf (closed))
Nordhausen (Halle–Kassel and Nordhausen–Northeim as well as Nordhausen–Wernigerode)
Obstfelderschmiede (Rottenbach–Katzhütte and Oberweißbacher Mountain Railway)
Oppurg (Gera–Saalfeld and Oppurg–Pössneck–Orlamünde (closed as far as Pössneck))
Orlamünde (Naumburg–Saalfeld and Orlamünde–Pössneck)
Plaue (Erfurt–Schweinfurt and Plaue–Ilmenau–Themar)
Porstendorf (Naumburg–Saalfeld and Crossen–Porstendorf (closed))
Probstzella (Saalfeld–Bamberg and Sonneberg–Probstzella (closed))
Reinsdorf (Sangerhausen–Erfurt and Reinsdorf–Naumburg (closed))
Reinhardsbrunn
Rennsteig (Plaue–Ilmenau–Themar and Rennsteig–Frauenwald (closed))
Rentwertshausen (Erfurt–Schweinfurt and Rentwertshausen–Römhild (closed))
Ritschenhausen (Ritschenhausen–Meiningen and Erfurt–Schweinfurt)
Ronneburg (Gera–Gößnitz and Meuselwitz–Ronneburg (closed))
Rottenbach (Arnstadt–Saalfeld and Rottenbach–Katzhütte)
Rudolstadt-Schwarza (Naumburg–Saalfeld and Schwarza–Bad Blankenburg (closed))
Saalfeld (Naumburg–Saalfeld–Bamberg, Gera–Saalfeld and Arnstadt–Saalfeld)
Schleusingen (Plaue–Ilmenau–Themar and Suhl–Schleusingen (closed))
Schmalkalden (Wernshausen–Zella-Mehlis and Schmalkalden–Brotterode (closed))
Seelingstädt
Silberhausen (Gotha–Leinefelde, Leinefelde–Eschwege (closed) and Silberhausen–Hüpstedt (closed))
Sondershausen (Erfurt–Nordhausen and Sondershausen–Bretleben (closed))
Sonneberg (Coburg–Sonneberg, Eisfeld–Sonneberg, Sonneberg–Neuhaus–Probstzella and Sonneberg–Kronach (closed))
Straussfurt (Erfurt–Nordhausen, Straussfurt–Grossheringen and Ballstädt–Straussfurt (closed))
Suhl (Erfurt–Schweinfurt and Suhl–Schleusingen (closed))
Themar (Meiningen–Eisfeld and Plaue–Ilmenau–Themar)
Treffurt (Eschwege–Eisenach (closed) and Mühlhausen–Treffurt (closed))
Triptis (Gera–Saalfeld and Triptis–Bad Lobenstein (closed)) 
Unterlemnitz (Hockeroda–Bad Lobenstein and Triptis–Unterlemnitz (closed)) 
Vacha (Bad Salzungen–Vacha (currently out of service), Vacha–Tann (closed) and Gerstungen–Vacha (closed))
Waltershausen
Wartha (Halle–Bebra and Wartha-Treffurt)
Weida (Gera–Saalfeld and Werdau–Weida–Mehltheuer (closed to Werdau))
Weimar (Halle–Erfurt, Weimar–Gera, Weimar–Kranichfeld, Weimar–Buchenwald (closed) and Weimar–Großrudestedt (closed))
Wenigentaft-Mansbach (Bad Salzungen–Tann (closed), Hünfeld–Wenigentaft-Mansbach (closed) and Wenigentaft-Mansbach–Oechsen (closed))
Wernshausen (Eisenach–Meiningen, Wernshausen–Zella-Mehlis and Wernshausen–Trusetal (closed))
Wolkramshausen (Halle–Kassel and (Nordhausen)–Wolkramshausen–Erfurt)
Wünschendorf (Gera–Plauen and Werdau–Weida (closed))
Wutha (Erfurt–Eisenach and Wutha–Ruhla (closed))
Zella-Mehlis (Erfurt–Schweinfurt and Wernshausen–Zella-Mehlis)
Zeulenroda lower station (Weida–Mehltheuer and branch to Zeulenroda upper station (closed))

Sources

See also
German station categories
Railway station types of Germany
List of scheduled railway routes in Germany

External links 
 Online timetable of DB services

 
Thur
Rail